Jan Mikula (born 5 January 1992) is a Czech professional footballer who plays as a defender for Slovan Liberec.

He made his career league debut for FC Vysočina Jihlava on 19 October 2013 in a 0-0 away draw at Bohemians 1905. He scored his first career league goal for SK Slavia Prague on 2 August 2015 in a 2-2 home draw against FC Slovan Liberec.

References
 
 
 

Czech footballers
Czech Republic youth international footballers
Czech Republic under-21 international footballers
1992 births
Living people
Czech First League players
SK Slavia Prague players
Association football defenders
Sportspeople from Havlíčkův Brod
FC Vysočina Jihlava players
FC Slovan Liberec players